The nation of Georgia ( sakartvelo) was first unified as a kingdom under the Bagrationi dynasty by the King Bagrat III of Georgia in the early 11th century, arising from a number of predecessor states of the ancient kingdoms of Colchis and Iberia. The Kingdom of Georgia flourished during the 10th to 12th centuries under King David IV the Builder and Queen Tamar the Great, and fell to the Mongol invasion by 1243, and after a brief reunion under George V the Brilliant to the Timurid Empire. By 1490, Georgia was fragmented into a number of petty kingdoms and principalities, which throughout the Early Modern period struggled to maintain their autonomy against Ottoman and Iranian (Safavid, Afsharid, and Qajar) domination until Georgia was finally annexed by the Russian Empire in the 19th century. After a brief bid for independence with the Democratic Republic of Georgia of 1918–1921, Georgia was part of the Transcaucasian Socialist Federative Soviet Republic from 1922 to 1936, and then formed the Georgian Soviet Socialist Republic until the dissolution of the Soviet Union.

The current republic of Georgia has been independent since 1991. The first president Zviad Gamsakhurdia stoked Georgian nationalism and vowed to assert Tbilisi's authority over Abkhazia and South Ossetia. Gamsakhurdia was deposed in a bloody coup d'état within the same year and the country became embroiled in a bitter civil war, which lasted until 1995. Supported by Russia, Abkhazia and South Ossetia achieved de facto independence from Georgia. The Rose Revolution forced Eduard Shevardnadze to resign in 2003. The new government under Mikheil Saakashvili prevented the secession of a third breakaway republic in the Adjara crisis of 2004, but the conflict with Abkhazia and South Ossetia led to the 2008 Russo–Georgian War and tensions with Russia remain unresolved.

The history of Georgia is inextricably linked with the history of the Georgian people.

Prehistoric period

Evidence for the earliest occupation of the territory of present-day Georgia goes back to c. 1.8 million years ago, as evident from the excavations of Dmanisi in the south-eastern part of the country. This is the oldest evidence of humans anywhere in the world outside Africa. Later prehistoric remains (Acheulian, Mousterian and the Upper Palaeolithic) are known from numerous cave and open-air sites in Georgia.  The earliest agricultural Neolithic occupation is dated sometime between 6000 and 5000 BC. known as the Shulaveri-Shomu culture, where people used local obsidian for tools, raised animals such as cattle and pigs, and grew crops, including grapes.

Numerous excavations in tell settlements of the Shulaveri-Shomu type have been conducted since the 1960s.

Early metallurgy started in Georgia during the 6th millennium BC, associated with the Shulaveri-Shomu culture. From the beginning of the 4th millennium, metals became used to larger extend in East Georgia and in the whole Transcaucasian region.

In the 1970s, archaeological excavations revealed a number of ancient settlements that included houses with galleries, carbon-dated to the 5th millennium BC in the Imiris-gora region of Eastern Georgia. These dwellings were circular or oval in plan, a characteristic feature being the central pier and chimney. These features were used and further developed in building Georgian dwellings and houses of the 'Darbazi' type. In the Chalcolithic period of the fourth and third millennia BC, Georgia and eastern Asia Minor were home to the Kura-Araxes culture, giving way in the second millennium BC. to the Trialeti culture. Archaeological excavations have brought to light the remains of settlements at Beshtasheni and Ozni (4th–3rd millennium BC), and barrow burials (carbon dated to the 2nd millennium BC) in the province of Trialeti, at Tsalka (Eastern Georgia). Together, they testify to an advanced and well-developed culture of building and architecture.

Diauehi, a tribal union of early-Georgians, first appear in written history in the 12th century BC. Archaeological finds and references in ancient sources reveal elements of early political and state formations characterized by advanced metallurgy and goldsmith techniques that date back to the 7th century BC and beyond. Between 2100 and 750 BC, the area survived the invasions by the Hittites, Urartians, Medes, Proto-Persians and Cimmerians. At the same period, the ethnic unity of Proto-Kartvelians broke up into several branches, among them Svans, Zans/Chans and East-Kartvelians. That finally led to the formation of modern Kartvelian languages: Georgian (originating from East Kartvelian vernaculars), Svan, Megrelian and Laz (the latter two originating from Zan dialects). By that time Svans were dominant in modern Svaneti and Abkhazia, Zans inhabited modern Georgian province of Samegrelo, while East-Kartvelians formed the majority in modern eastern Georgia. As a result of cultural and geographic delimitation, two core areas of future Georgian culture and statehood formed in western and eastern Georgia by the end of the 8th century BC. The first two Georgian states emerged in the west known as the Kingdom of Colchis and in the east as the Kingdom of Iberia.

Antiquity

Early Georgian kingdoms of Colchis and Iberia

A second Georgian tribal union emerged in the 13th century BC on the Black Sea coast under the Kingdom of Colchis in western Georgia. The kingdom of Colchis, which existed from the 6th to the 1st centuries BC is regarded as the first early Georgian state formation and the term Colchians was used as the collective term for early Georgian-Kartvelian tribes such as Mingrelians, Lazs and Chans who populated the eastern coast of the Black Sea.

According to the scholar of the Caucasian studies Cyril Toumanoff:

The ancient Greeks knew of Colchis, and it featured in the Greek legend of Jason and the Argonauts, who travelled there in search of the Golden Fleece. Starting around 2000 BC, northwestern Colchis was inhabited by the Svan and Zan peoples of the Kartvelian tribes. Another important ethnic element of ancient Colchis were Greeks who between 1000 and 550 BC established many trading colonies in the coastal area, among them Naessus, Pityus, Dioscurias (modern Sukhumi), Guenos, Phasis (modern Poti), Apsaros, and Rhizos (modern Rize in Turkey). In the eastern part of Georgia there was a struggle for the leadership among the various Georgian confederations during the 6th–4th centuries BC, which was finally won by the Kartlian tribes from the region of Mtskheta. According to the Georgian tradition, the Kingdom of Kartli (known as Iberia in the Greek-Roman literature) was founded around 300 BC by Parnavaz I, the first ruler of the Parnavazid dynasty.

Between 653 and 333 BC, both Colchis and Iberia survived successive invasions by the Iranian Median Empire. The case is different for the Achaemenid Persians however. According to Herodotus (3.97), Achaemenid power extended as far as the Caucasus mountains, but the Colchians are not included in his list of the twenty Persian satrapies. Nor are they referred to in the lists of Achaemenid lands (dahyāva) given in the Old Persian inscriptions of Darius and his successors.  In Xenophon's Anabasis (7.8.25; probably an interpolation) the tribes of Colchis and East Pontus are referred to as independent (autónomoi). On the other hand, Herodotus mentioned both the Colchians and various Pontic tribes in his catalogue (7.78-79) of approximately fifty-seven peoples who participated in Xerxes’ expedition against Greece in 481-80 BC.  As the Encyclopaedia Iranica states, it is thus probable that the Achaemenids never succeeded in asserting effective rule over Colchis, though local tribal leaders seem to have acknowledged some kind of Persian suzerainty. The Encyclopaedia Iranica further states, whereas the adjoining Pontic tribes of the nineteenth satrapy and the Armenians of the thirteenth are mentioned as having paid tribute to Persia, the Colchians and their Caucasian neighbors are not; they had, however, undertaken to send gifts (100 boys and 100 girls) every five years (Herodotus 3.97).

At the end of the 4th century BC southern Iberia witnessed the invading armies of Alexander the Great, who established a vast Greco-Macedonian empire to the south of the Caucasus. Neither Iberia nor Colchis was incorporated into the empire of Alexander or any of the successor Hellenistic states of the Middle East.  However, the culture of ancient Greece still had a considerable influence on the region, and Greek was widely spoken in the cities of Colchis. In Iberia Greek influence was less noticeable and Aramaic was widely spoken.

Between the early 2nd century BC and the late 2nd century AD both Colchis and Iberia, together with the neighboring countries, became an arena of long and devastating conflicts between major and local powers such as Rome, Armenia and the short-lived Kingdom of Pontus.
Pompey's campaign in 66-65 BC annexed Armenia and then he headed north along the Kura river and then west down the Rioni river to the Black Sea. In 189 BC, the rapidly growing Kingdom of Armenia took over more than half of Iberia, conquering the southern and southeastern provinces of Gogarene, Taokhia and Genyokhia, as well as some other territories. Between 120 and 63 BC, Armenia's ally Mithridate VI Eupator of Pontus conquered all of Colchis and incorporated it into his kingdom, embracing almost all of Asia Minor as well as the eastern and northern Black Sea coastal areas.

The Roman–Iranian rivalry and the Roman conquest of Colchis

This close association with Armenia brought upon the country an invasion (65 BC) by the Roman general Pompey, who was then at war with Mithradates VI of Pontus, and Armenia; but Rome did not establish her power permanently over Iberia. Nineteen years later (36 BC), the Romans again marched on Iberia forcing King Pharnavaz II to join their campaign against Caucasian Albania.

During this time Armenia and Pontus were actively expanding at the expense of Rome, taking over its Eastern Mediterranean possessions. However, the success of the anti-Roman alliance did not last long. As a result of the Roman campaigns of Pompey and Lucullus from the west, and the Parthian invasion from the south, Armenia lost a significant part of its conquests by 65 BC, devolving into a Roman-Parthian dependency. At the same time, the Kingdom of Pontus was completely destroyed by the Romans and all its territory including Colchis were incorporated into the Roman Empire as her provinces.

The former Kingdom of Colchis became the Roman province of Lazicum ruled by Roman legati. The following 600 years of Georgian history were marked by struggles between Rome and neighboring Persia (Iran) ruled subsequently by the Parthians and Sassanids who were fighting long wars against each other for the domination in Western Asia including Syria, Mesopotamia, Armenia, Albania, and Iberia.

While the Georgian kingdom of Colchis was administered as a Roman province, Caucasian Iberia freely accepted the Roman Imperial protection. A stone inscription discovered at Mtskheta speaks of the 1st-century ruler Mihdrat I (AD 58–106) as "the friend of the Caesars" and the king "of the Roman-loving Iberians." Emperor Vespasian fortified the ancient Mtskheta site of Armazi for the Iberian kings in 75 AD.

In the 2nd century AD, Iberia strengthened her position in the area, especially during the reign of King Pharsman II who achieved full independence from Rome and reconquered some of the previously lost territories from declining Armenia. In the early 3rd century, Rome had to give up Albania and most of Armenia to Sassanid Persia. The province of Lazicum was given a degree of autonomy that by the end of the century developed into full independence with the formation of a new Kingdom of Lazica-Egrisi on the territories of smaller principalities of the Zans, Svans, Apsyls, and Sanyghs. This new Western Georgian state survived more than 250 years until 562 when it was absorbed by the Byzantine Empire.

In the 3rd century AD, the Lazi tribe came to dominate most of Colchis, establishing the kingdom of Lazica, locally known as Egrisi. Colchis was a scene of the protracted rivalry between the Eastern Roman/Byzantine and Sassanid empires, culminating in the Lazic War from 542 to 562.

Iberia became a tributary of the Sasanian state during the reign of Shapur I (241–272). Relations between the two countries seem to have been friendly at first, as Iberia cooperated in Persian campaigns against Rome, and the Iberian king Amazasp III (260–265) was listed as a high dignitary of the Sasanian realm, not a vassal who had been subdued by force of arms. But the aggressive tendencies of the Sasanians were evident in their propagation of Zoroastrianism, which was probably established in Iberia between the 260s and 290s.

However, in the Peace of Nisibis (298) while the Roman empire obtained control of Caucasian Iberia again as a vassal state and acknowledged the reign over all the Caucasian area, it recognized Mirian III, the first of the Chosroid dynasty, as king of Iberia.

Adoption of Christianity as state religion

Before Christianization, the cult of Mithras and Zoroastrianism were commonly practiced in Iberia from the 1st century. The cult of Mithras, distinguished by its syncretic character and thus complementary to local cults, especially the cult of the Sun, gradually came to merge with ancient Georgian beliefs.
The eastern Georgian Kingdom of Iberia became one of the first states in the world to convert to Christianity in 327, when the King of Iberia Mirian III established it as the official state religion. However, the date varies based on numerous accounts and historical documents, which indicate Iberia adopting Christianity as a state religion in 317, 319, 324, 330 etc. According to The Georgian Chronicles, St. Nino of Cappadocia converted Georgia to Christianity in 330 during the time of Constantine the Great. By the middle of the 4th century though, both Lazica (formerly the Kingdom of Colchis) and Iberia adopted Christianity as their official religion. This adoption of Christianity tied the kingdom to the Byzantine Empire, which exerted strong cultural influence over it.

However, after the emperor Julian was slain during his failed campaign in Persia in 363, Rome ceded control of Iberia to Persia, and King Varaz-Bakur I (Asphagur) (363-365) became a Persian vassal, an outcome confirmed by the Peace of Acilisene in 387. However, a later ruler of Kartli, Pharsman IV (406-409), preserved his country's autonomy and ceased to pay tribute to Persia. Persia prevailed, and Sassanian kings began to appoint a viceroy (pitiaxae/bidaxae) to keep watch on their vassal. They eventually made the office hereditary in the ruling house of Lower Kartli, thus inaugurating the Kartli pitiaxate, which brought an extensive territory under its control. Although it remained a part of the kingdom of Kartli, its viceroys turned their domain into a center of Persian influence. Sasanian rulers put the Christianity of the Georgians to a severe test. They promoted the teachings of Zoroaster, and by the middle of the 5th century Zoroastrianism had become a second official religion in eastern Georgia alongside Christianity.

During the 4th and most of the 5th centuries, Iberia (known also as the Kingdom of Kartli) was under Persian control. At the end of the 5th century though, Prince Vakhtang I Gorgasali orchestrated an anti-Persian uprising and restored Iberian statehood, proclaiming himself the King. After this, the armies of Vakhtang launched several campaigns against both Persia and the Byzantine Empire. However, his struggle for the independence and unity of the Georgian state did not have lasting success. After Vakhtang's death in 502, and the short reign of his son Dachi (502–514), Iberia was reincorporated into Persia as a province once again. The Kingdom of Iberia however was abolished in 580 AD by the Persian authorities at that time ruled by Hormizd IV (578-590), most precisely after the death of King Bakur III, and Iberia became now a Persian province ruled by a marzpan (governor).  However this time the Iberian nobility were granted the privilege of electing the governors, who in Georgian were called erismtavari. Georgian nobles urged the Byzantine emperor Maurice to revive the kingdom of Iberia in 582, but in 591 Byzantium and Persia decisively agreed to divide Iberia between them, with Tbilisi to be in Persian hands and Mtskheta to be under Byzantine control. By the late 7th century, the Byzantine-Persian rivalry for the Middle East had given way to Arab conquest of the region and subsequent invasions to ensure Arab hegemony in the Caucasus.

Medieval Georgia

Unification of the Georgian state

In the struggle against the Arab occupation, the Bagrationi dynasty came to rule over Tao-Klarjeti and established Kouropalatate of Iberia as a nominal dependency under the Byzantine Empire. The restoration of the Georgian kingship begins in AD 888, when Adarnase IV took the title of "King of Iberians". However, the Bagrationi dynasty failed to maintain the integrity of their kingdom which was actually divided between the three branches of the family with the main branch retaining Tao and another controlling Klarjeti. At the end of the 10th century Curopalate David of Tao invaded the Earldom of Iberia (Kartli) and gave it to his foster-son Bagrat III and installed Gurgen as his regent, who was later crowned as "King of Kings of the Iberians" on the death of Bagrat the Simple (994). Through his fortunate bloodlines Bagrat was destined to sit upon two thrones. Furthermore, through his mother Gurandukht, sister of the childless Abkhazian king Theodosius III, Bagrat was a potential heir to the realm of Abkhazia. Three years later, after the death of Theodosius III, Bagrat III inherited the Abkhazian throne. In 1008, Gurgen died, and Bagrat succeeded him as "King of the Iberians", becoming thus the first King of a unified realm of Abkhazia and Iberia. After he had secured his patrimony, Bagrat proceeded to press a claim to the easternmost Georgian kingdom of Kakheti-Hereti and annexed it in or around 1010, after two years of fighting and aggressive diplomacy. Bagrat's reign, a period of uttermost importance in the history of Georgia, brought about the final victory of the Georgian Bagratids in the centuries-long power struggles. Anxious to create more stable and centralized monarchy, Bagrat eliminated or at least diminished the autonomy of the dynastic princes. In his eyes, the most possible internal danger came from the Klarjeti line of the Bagrationi. Although seem to have acknowledged Bagrat's authority, they continued to be styled as Kings, and Sovereigns of Klarjeti. To secure the succession to his son, George I, Bagrat lured his cousins, on pretext of a reconciliatory meeting, to the Panaskerti Castle, and threw them in prison in 1010. Bagrat's foreign policy was generally peaceful and the king successfully manoeuvred to avoid the conflicts with both the Byzantine and Muslim neighbours even though David's domains of Tao remained in the Byzantine and Tbilisi in the Arab hands.

Between Seljuqs and Byzantines 

The major political and military event during George I’s reign, a war against the Byzantine Empire, had its roots back to the 990s, when the Georgian prince Curopalate David of Tao, following his abortive rebellion against Emperor Basil II, had to agree to cede his extensive possessions in Tao and the neighbouring lands to the emperor on his death.  All the efforts by David’s stepson and George’s father, Bagrat III, to prevent these territories from being annexed to the empire went in vain.  Young and ambitious, George launched a campaign to restore the Kuropalates’ succession to Georgia and occupied Tao in 1015–1016.  Byzantines were at that time involved in a relentless war with the Bulgarian Empire, limiting their actions to the west. But as soon as Bulgaria was conquered, Basil II led his army against Georgia (1021). An exhausting war lasted for two years, and ended in a decisive Byzantine victory, forcing George to agree to a peace treaty, in which he had not only to abandon his claims to Tao, but to surrender several of his southwestern possessions to Basil, and to give his three-year-old son, Bagrat IV, as hostage.

The young child Bagrat IV spent the next three years in the imperial capital of Constantinople and was released in 1025.  After George I's death in 1027, Bagrat, aged eight, succeeded to the throne. By the time Bagrat IV became king, the Bagratids’ drive to complete the unification of all Georgian lands had gained irreversible momentum.  The kings of Georgia sat at Kutaisi in western Georgia from which they ran all of what had been the Kingdom of Abkhazia and a greater portion of Iberia; Tao had been lost to the Byzantines while a Muslim emir remained in Tbilisi and the kings of Kakheti-Hereti obstinately defended their autonomy in easternmost Georgia. Furthermore, the loyalty of great nobles to the Georgian crown was far from stable. During Bagrat's minority, the regency had advanced the positions of the high nobility whose influence he subsequently tried to limit when he assumed full ruling powers.  Simultaneously, the Georgian crown was confronted with two formidable external foes: the Byzantine Empire and the resurgent Seljuq Turks.

The Seljuk threat prompted the Georgian and Byzantine governments to seek a closer cooperation.  To secure the alliance, Bagrat's daughter Mart’a (Maria) married, at some point between 1066 and 1071, the Byzantine co-emperor Michael VII Ducas.

Great Seljuk invasion 
The second half of the 11th century was marked by the strategically significant invasion of the Seljuq Turks, who by the end of the 1040s had succeeded in building a vast empire including most of Central Asia and Persia.  The Seljuqs made their first appearances in Georgia in the 1060s, when the sultan Alp Arslan laid waste to the south-western provinces of the Georgian kingdom and reduced Kakheti.  These intruders were part of the same wave of the Turkish movement which inflicted a crushing defeat on the Byzantine army at Manzikert in 1071.  Although the Georgians were able to recover from Alp Arslan's invasion by securing the Tao (Theme of Iberia), a frontier region which had been a bone of contention between Georgia and the Byzantine Empire, the Byzantine withdrawal from Anatolia brought them in more direct contact with the Seljuqs.  Following the 1073 devastation of Kartli by the Seljuk sultan Alp Arslan, George II successfully repelled an invasion.  In 1076, the Seljuk sultan Malik Shah I surged into Georgia and reduced many settlements to ruins.  Harassed by the massive Turkic influx, known in Georgian history as the Great Turkish Invasion, from 1079/80 onward, George was pressured into submitting to Malik-Shah to ensure a precious degree of peace at the price of an annual tribute.

King David IV the Builder and Georgian Reconquista

The struggle against the Seljuq invaders in Georgia was led by the young King David IV of the Bagrationi royal family, who inherited the throne in 1089 at the age of 16 after the abdication of his father George II Bagrationi. Soon after coming to power, David created the regular army and peasant militia in order to be able to resist Seljuq colonization of his country. The First Crusade (1096–1099) and the Crusaders' offensive against the Seljuq Turks in Anatolia and Syria favored David's successful campaigns in Georgia. By the end of 1099 David had stopped paying tribute to the Seljuqs and had liberated most of the Georgian lands, with the exception of Tbilisi and Hereti. In 1103 he reorganized the Georgian Orthodox Church and closely linked it with the state by appointing as Catholicos (Archbishop) a Crown Chancellor (Mtsihnobart Ukhutsesi) of Georgia. In 1103–1105 the Georgian army took over Hereti and made successful raids into still Seljuq-controlled Shirvan. Between 1110 and 1118 David took Lori, Samshvilde, Rustavi and other fortresses of lower Kartli and Tashiri, thus turning Tbilisi into an isolated Seljuq enclave.

In 1118–1119, having considerable amounts of free, unsettled land as a result of the withdrawal of Turkish nomads, and desperately needing qualified manpower for the army, King David invited some 40,000 Kipchak warriors from North Caucasus to settle in Georgia with their families. In 1120 the ruler of Alania recognized himself as King David's vassal and afterwards sent thousands of Alans to cross the main Caucasus range into Georgia, where they settled in Kartli. The Georgian Royal army also welcomed mercenaries from Germany, Italy, and Scandinavia (all those westerners were defined in Georgia as "the Franks") as well as from Kievan Rus.

In 1121, the Seljuq Sultan Mahmud declared Jihad on Georgia and sent a strong army under one of his famous generals Ilghazi to fight the Georgians. Although significantly outnumbered by the Turks, the Georgians managed to defeat the invaders at the Battle of Didgori, and in 1122 they took over Tbilisi, making it Georgia's capital. Three years later the Georgians conquered Shirvan. As a result, the mostly Christian-populated Ghishi-Kabala area in western Shirvan (a relic of the once prosperous Albanian Kingdom) was annexed by Georgia while the rest of already Islamicized Shirvan became Georgia's client-state. In the same year a large portion of Armenia was liberated by David's troops and fell into Georgian hands as well. Thus in 1124 David also became the King of Armenians, incorporating Northern Armenia into the lands of the Georgian Crown. In 1125 King David died, leaving Georgia with the status of a strong regional power. In Georgia, King David is called Agmashenebeli (English: the builder).

David Agmashenebeli's successors (Kings Demeter I, David V and George III) continued the policy of Georgia's expansion by subordinating most of the mountain clans and tribes of North Caucasia and further securing Georgian positions in Shirvan. However, the most glorious sovereign of Georgia of that period was Queen Tamar (David's great-granddaughter).

Queen Tamar the Great and the Golden Age (1184–1213)

The reign of Queen Tamar represented the peak of Georgia's might in the whole history of the nation. In 1194–1204, Tamar's armies crushed new Turkish invasions from the south-east and south and launched several successful campaigns into Turkish-controlled Southern Armenia. As a result, most of Southern Armenia, including the cities of Karin, Erzinjan, Khelat, Muş and Van, came under Georgian control. Although it was not included in the lands of the Georgian Crown, and was left under the nominal rule of local Turkish Emirs and Sultans, Southern Armenia became a protectorate of the Kingdom of Georgia.

The temporary fall of the Byzantine Empire in 1204 to the Crusaders left Georgia and Bulgarian Empire as the strongest Christian states in the whole East Mediterranean area. The same year Queen Tamar sent her troops to take over the former Byzantine Lazona and Paryadria with the cities of Atina, Riza, Trebizond, Kerasunt, Amysos, Cotyora, Heraclea and Sinopa. In 1205, the occupied territory was transformed into the Empire of Trebizond, which was dependent on Georgia. Tamar's relative Prince Alexios Komnenos was crowned as its Emperor. In the immediate years after, Georgian armies invaded northern Persia (modern day Iranian Azerbaijan) and took the cities of Marand, Tabriz (1208), Ardabil (1208), Zanjan, Khoy (1210), and Qazvin (1210), placing part of the conquered territory under a Georgian protectorate. This was the maximum territorial extent of Georgia throughout her history. Queen Tamar was addressed as "The Queen of Abkhazians, Kartvels, Rans, Kakhs and Armenians, Shirvan-Shakhine and Shakh-in-Shakhine, The Sovereign of the East and West". Georgian historians often refer to her as "Queen Tamar the Great".

The period between the early 12th and the early 13th centuries, and especially the era of Tamar the Great, can truly be considered as the golden age of Georgia. Besides the political and military achievements, it was marked by the development of Georgian culture, including architecture, literature, philosophy and sciences.

Mongol invasion and decline of the Georgian Kingdom

In 1225 Jalal ad-Din Mingburnu, the ruler of Khwarezmian Empire, attacked Georgia, defeating its forces in the battle of Garni, and conquered Tbilisi., after which allegedly a hundred thousand citizens were put to death for not renouncing Christianity.

In the 1220s, the South Caucasus and Asia Minor faced the invasion of the Mongols. In spite of fierce resistance by Georgian-Armenian forces and their allies, the whole area including most of Georgia, all Armenian lands and Central Anatolia eventually fell to the Mongols.

In 1243, Queen Rusudan of Georgia signed a peace treaty with the Mongols in accordance with which Georgia lost her client-states, ceded western Shirvan, Nakhichevan and some other territories and agreed to pay tribute to the Mongols as well as to let them occupy and de facto rule more than half of the remaining territory. Although Mongol-occupied Tbilisi remained an official capital of the kingdom, the Queen refused to return there and stayed in Kutaisi until her death in 1245. In addition to all the above hardships, even the part of the kingdom that remained free of the Mongols started disintegrating: The Crown started losing control over the warlords of Samtskhe (southern provinces of Georgia) who established their own relations with the Mongols and by the year 1266 practically seceded from Georgia.

The period between 1259 and 1330 was marked by the struggle of the Georgians against the Mongol Ilkhanate for full independence. The first anti-Mongol uprising started in 1259 under the leadership of King David Narin who in fact waged his war for almost thirty years. The Anti-Mongol strife went on under the Kings Demeter II (1270–1289) and David VIII (1293–1311). Finally, it was King George the Brilliant (1314–1346) who managed to play on the decline of the Ilkhanate, stopped paying tribute to the Mongols, restored the pre-1220 state borders of Georgia, and returned the Empire of Trebizond into Georgia's sphere of influence.

In 1386–1403, the Kingdom of Georgia faced eight Turco-Mongolic invasions under the leadership of Tamerlane. Except in Abkhazia and Svaneti, the invasions devastated Georgia's economy, population, and urban centers.

Early modern period

Ottoman and Iranian domination

In the 15th century the whole area changed dramatically in all possible aspects: linguistic, cultural, political, etc. During that period the Kingdom of Georgia turned into an isolated, fractured Christian enclave, a relic of the faded East Roman epoch surrounded by a Muslim, predominantly Turco-Iranian world. During the three subsequent centuries, the Georgian rulers maintained their perilous autonomy as subjects under the Turkish Ottoman and Iranian Safavid, Afsharid, and Qajar domination, although sometimes serving as little more than puppets in the hands of their powerful suzerains.

By the middle of the 15th century, most of Georgia's old neighbor-states disappeared from the map within less than a hundred years. The fall of Constantinople to the Ottoman Turks in 1453 sealed the Black Sea and cut the remnants of Christian states of the area from Europe and the rest of the Christian world. Georgia remained connected to the West through contact with the Genoese colonies of the Crimea.

As a result of these changes, the Georgian Kingdom suffered economic and political decline and in the 1460s the kingdom fractured into several kingdoms and principalities:
3 Kingdoms of Kartli, Kakheti and Imereti.
5 Principalities of Guria, Svaneti, Meskheti, Abkhazeti and Samegrelo.

By the late 15th century the Ottoman Empire was encroaching on the Georgian states from the west and in 1501 a new Muslim power, Safavid Iran, arose to the east. For the next few centuries, Georgia would become a battleground between these two great rival powers and the Georgian states would struggle to maintain their independence by various means. Ottoman and Safavid Iranian encroachments started for the Ottomans in the late 15th century, and for the Safavids in the earliest 16th century in which the latter managed to make eastern Georgia a vassal in 1500. In 1555, the Ottomans and the Safavids signed the Peace of Amasya following the Ottoman–Safavid War (1532–55), defining spheres of influence in Georgia, assigning Imereti in the west to the Turks and Kartli-Kakheti in the east to the Persians. The treaty however, was not in force for long as the Ottomans gained the upper hand and launched campaigns during the next Ottoman-Safavid war threatening to end the Persian domination in the region. The Safavid Persians reestablished their hegemony over all lost regions some two decades later including full hegemony over most of Georgia in the Ottoman–Safavid War (1603–18).

After the Ottomans utter failure to gain permanent foothold in the eastern Caucasus, 
Iranians immediately sought to strengthen their position and finally subject the rebellious Kingdoms of Eastern Georgia and making them integral parts of the empire. During the next 150 years as Persian subjects, various Georgian kings and nobles rose into rebellion, while at many other times political activity was nothing but dormant, and many kings and aristocrats fully accepted Persian overlordship and converted to Islam as well, for greater boons from their Iranian Shahs. On the maternal side of the Safavid (also Qajar) and the Ottoman Turkish dynasty, many members were from Georgian aristocratic or different lines. In the early 17th century Shah Abbas I made a punitive campaign into his Georgian territories after being informed that Teimuraz I of Kakheti with a couple of Christian citizens assaulted the Karabakh governor and killed him. Shah Abbas decided to confront him but Teimuraz I fled to Georgia towards Ahmed I, in order to shelter from Safavid forces. This event brought an end to the Treaty of Nasuh Pasha signed between the Ottomans and the Safavids. In 1616, Abbas I dispatched his troops to Georgia. He aimed to suppress the Georgian revolt in Tbilisi, however the Safavid soldiers met heavy resistance by the citizens of Tbilisi. Enraged, Shah Abbas ordered a massacre of the public. A large number of Georgian soldiers and people were killed and as many as between 130,000 and 200,000 Georgians from Kakheti were deported to Persia. During the same conflict, Teimuraz sent the Queen mother, Ketevan, as a negotiator to Abbas, but in an act of revenge for the recalcitrance of Teimuraz, he ordered the queen to renounce Christianity, and upon her refusal, had her tortured to death. By the 17th century, both eastern and western Georgia had sunk into poverty as the result of the constant warfare. The economy was so bad that barter replaced the use of money and the populations of the cities declined markedly. The French traveller Jean Chardin, who visited the region of Mingrelia in 1671, noted the wretchedness of the peasants, the arrogance of the nobles and the ignorance of the clergy. The various rulers in Georgia were thus often split between acknowledging Ottoman or Iranian overlordship (which often entailed nominal conversion to Islam) or making a bid for independence. The emergence of a third imperial power to the north, Christian Russia, made the latter an increasingly tempting choice.

The 18th and 19th century

In the early 18th century, Kartli, the most politically dominant region of all Georgian areas, saw a partial recovery under Vakhtang VI, who instituted a new law code and tried to improve the economy. His reign saw the establishment of the first Georgian-language printing press in 1709.

Following a civil war and the resulting chaos that happened in the whole Safavid Empire after its disintegration and overthrow, the Ottomans and Russians decided to divide large parts of Persia in the Treaty of Constantinople (1724). Georgia got divided by the two. Following Persia's quick resurgence under Nader Shah of Iran, the Ottomans were ousted from Kakheti and the rest of Georgia in 1735 by Nader after two years of rule, which resulted in the quick reestablishment of Persian rule over this time almost all of Georgia. Teimuraz sided with the Persians and was installed as a Persian wali (governor) in neighboring Kartli. However, many Georgian nobles refused to accept the new regime and rose in rebellion in response to heavy tribute levied by Nader Shah upon the Georgian provinces. Nonetheless, Teimuraz and Heraclius remained loyal to the shah, partly in order to prevent the comeback of the rival Mukhrani branch, whose fall early in the 1720s had opened the way to Teimuraz's accession in Kartli. He then served as a lieutenant to his father and assumed the regency when Teimuraz was briefly summoned for consultations in the Persian capital of Isfahan in 1744. In the meantime, Heraclius defeated a coup attempt by the rival Georgian prince Abdullah Beg of the Mukhrani dynasty, and helped Teimuraz suppress the aristocratic opposition to the Persian hegemony led by Givi Amilakhvari. As a reward, Nader Shah granted the kingship of Kartli to Teimuraz and of Kakheti to Heraclius, and also arranged the marriage of his nephew Ali-Qoli Khan, who eventually would succeed him as Adil Shah, to Teimuraz's daughter Kethevan.

Yet, both Georgian kingdoms remained under heavy Persian tribute until Nader Shah was assassinated in 1747. Teimuraz and Heraclius took advantage of the ensuing political instability in Persia to assert their independence and expelled Persian garrisons from all key positions in Georgia, including Tbilisi. In close cooperation with each other, they managed to prevent a new revolt by the Mukhranian supporters fomented by Ebrahim Khan, brother of Adel Shah, in 1748. They concluded an anti-Persian alliance with the khans of Azerbaijan who were particularly vulnerable to the aggression from Persian warlords and agreed to recognize Heraclius's supremacy in eastern Transcaucasia. In 1752, the Georgian kings sent a mission to Russia to request 3,000 Russian troops or a subsidy to enable them to hire Circassian mercenaries in order to invade Persia and install a pro-Russian government there. The embassy failed to yield any results, however, for the Russian court was preoccupied with European affairs.

In 1762, Teimuraz II died while on a diplomatic mission to the court of St. Petersburg, and Heraclius succeeded him as King of Kartli, thus uniting eastern Georgia politically for the first time in three centuries. Erekle II, king of unified Kartli-Kakheti from 1762 to 1798, managed to unify east Georgia politically for the first time in three centuries. He turned towards Russia for protection against Ottoman and most notably Persian attacks. The Russian empress Catherine the Great was keen to have the Georgians as allies in her wars against the Turks, but sent only meagre forces to help them. In 1769–1772, a handful of Russian troops under General Gottlieb Heinrich Totleben fought against Turks in Imereti. The Russian troops retreated before a clash against the Turks. In 1783 Erekle signed the Treaty of Georgievsk with Russia, according to which Kartli-Kakheti got established as a protectorate of Russia, which guaranteed Georgia's territorial integrity and the continuation of its reigning Bagrationi dynasty in return for prerogatives in the conduct of Georgian foreign affairs. The treaty therefore confirmed that Georgia abjured any form of dependence on Persia (who had been the suzerains of most of Georgia for centuries) or another power, and every new Georgian monarch would require the confirmation and investiture of the Russian tsar, and have no diplomatic communications with other nations without Russia's prior consent. But when another Russo-Turkish War broke out in 1787, Erekle maintained diplomatic contacts with Ottoman liege Suleiman pasha from Akhaltsikhe and signed a separate treaty with him. This treaty was ratified by the sultan in the summer of 1787. Therefore, the Russians withdrew their troops from the region for use elsewhere, leaving Erekle's kingdom unprotected. In 1795, the new Persian shah, Agha Mohammed Khan, infuriated with the Treaty of Georgievsk which he saw as an act of treason, invaded the country and captured and burnt the capital, Tbilisi, to the ground, reestablishing Persian rule over Georgia.

In spite of failure to honour the terms of the Treaty of Georgievsk, Georgian rulers felt they had nobody else to turn to. After Erekle's death, a civil war broke out over the succession to the throne of Kartli-Kakheti and one of the rival candidates called on Russia to intervene and decide matters. On January 8, 1801, Tsar Paul I of Russia signed a decree on the incorporation of Georgia (Kingdom of Kartli-Kakheti) within the Russian Empire, which was confirmed by Tsar Alexander I on September 12, 1801. The Georgian envoy in Saint Petersburg, Garsevan Chavchavadze, reacted with a note of protest that was presented to the Russian vice-chancellor Alexander Kurakin. In May 1801 Russian General Carl Heinrich Knorring dethroned the Georgian heir to the throne David Batonishvili and deployed a government headed by General Ivan Petrovich Lasarev. By this, Persia officially lost control over the city and the wider Georgian lands it had been ruling for centuries.

A part of the Georgian nobility did not accept the decree until April 1802 when General Knorring compassed the nobility in Tbilisi's Sioni Cathedral and forced them to take an oath on the imperial crown of Russia. Those who disagreed were arrested temporarily.

In the summer of 1805 Russian troops on the river Askerani and near Zagam defeated the Qajar Persian army during the Russo-Persian War (1804-1813) led by Fath-Ali Shah Qajar who sought to regain full control over Georgia and Dagestan, saving Tbilisi from its attack. Russian suzerainty over Persia's traditionally eastern and southern Georgian ruled territories were nominally finalized in 1813 in the Treaty of Gulistan. In 1810, the kingdom of Imereti (Western Georgia) was annexed by the Russian Empire after the suppression of King Solomon II's resistance. From 1803 to 1878, as a result of numerous Russian wars against Turkey and Persia, several formerly Georgian territories were annexed to the Russian Empire. These areas (Batumi, Artvin, Akhaltsikhe, Poti, and Abkhazia) now represent the majority of the territory of the present state of Georgia. Georgia was reunified for the first time in centuries but had lost its independence.

Modern history

Russian Empire

The Russian and Georgian societies had much in common: the main religion was Orthodox Christianity and in both countries a land-owning aristocracy ruled over a population of serfs. The Russian authorities aimed to integrate Georgia into the rest of their empire, but at first Russian rule proved high-handed, arbitrary and insensitive to local law and customs, leading to a conspiracy by Georgian nobles in 1832 and a revolt by peasants and nobles in Guria in 1841. Things changed with the appointment of Mikhail Vorontsov as Viceroy of the Caucasus in 1845. Count Vorontsov's new policies, alleged by himself, won over the Georgian nobility, who became increasingly eager to abandon Islamic influences that had been forced upon Georgia in the preceding centuries and pursued, after the example of Russian nobility, a long-sought process of Europeanisation. Life for Georgian serfs was very different, however, since the rural economy remained seriously depressed. Georgian serfs lived in dire poverty, subject to the frequent threat of starvation. Few of them lived in the towns, where what little trade and industry there was, was in the hands of Armenians, whose ancestors had migrated to Georgia in the Middle Ages.

Serfdom was abolished in Russian lands in 1861. The tsar also wanted to emancipate the serfs of Georgia, but without losing the loyalty of the nobility whose revenues depended on peasant labour. This called for delicate negotiations before serfdom was gradually phased out in the Georgian provinces from 1864 onwards.

Growth of the national movement

The emancipation of the serfs pleased neither the serfs nor the nobles. The poverty of the serfs had not been alleviated while the nobles had lost some of their privileges. The nobles in particular also felt threatened by the growing power of the urban, Armenian middle class in Georgia, who prospered as capitalism came to the region. Georgian dissatisfaction with Tsarist autocracy and Armenian economic domination  led to the development of a national liberation movement in the second half of the 19th century.

A large-scale peasant revolt occurred in 1905, which led to political reforms that eased the tensions for a period. During this time, the Marxist Social Democratic Party became the dominant political movement in Georgia, being elected to all the Georgian seats in the Russian State Duma established after 1905. Josef Vissarionovich Djugashvili (more famously known as Joseph Stalin), a Georgian Bolshevik, became a leader of the revolutionary (and anti-Menshevik) movement in Georgia. He went on to control the Soviet Union.

Many Georgians were upset by the loss of independence of the Georgian Orthodox Church. The Russian clergy took control of Georgian churches and monasteries, prohibiting use of the Georgian liturgy and desecrating medieval Georgian frescos on various churches all across Georgia.

Between the years of 1855 to 1907, the Georgian patriotic movement was launched under the leadership of Prince Ilia Chavchavadze, world-renowned poet, novelist and orator. Chavchavadze financed new Georgian schools and supported the Georgian national theatre. In 1866 he launched the newspaper Iveria, which played an important part in reviving Georgian national consciousness. His struggle for national awakening was welcomed by the leading Georgian intellectuals of that time such as Giorgi Tsereteli, Ivane Machabeli, Akaki Tsereteli, Niko Nikoladze, Alexander Kazbegi and Iakob Gogebashvili.

The Georgian intelligentsia's support for Prince Chavchavadze and Georgian independence is shown in this declaration:

The last decades of the 19th century witnessed a Georgian literary revival in which writers emerged of a stature unequalled since the Golden Age of Rustaveli seven hundred years before. Ilia Chavchavadze himself excelled alike in lyric and ballad poetry, in the novel, the short story and the essay. Apart from Chavchavadze, the most universal literary genius of the age was Akaki Tsereteli, known as "the immortal nightingale of the Georgian people." Along with Niko Nikoladze and Iakob Gogebashvili, these literary figures contributed significantly to the national cultural revival and were therefore known as the founding fathers of modern Georgia.

Democratic Republic of Georgia (1918–1921)

The Russian Revolution of October 1917 plunged Russia into a bloody civil war during which several outlying Russian territories declared independence. Georgia was one of them, proclaiming the establishment of the independent Democratic Republic of Georgia (DRG) on May 26, 1918. The new country was ruled by the Menshevik faction of the Social Democratic Party, which established a multi-party system in sharp contrast with the "dictatorship of the proletariat" established by the Bolsheviks in Russia. It was recognised by Soviet Russia (Treaty of Moscow (1920)) and the major Western powers in 1921

Georgian–Armenian War (1918)

During the final stages of World War I, the Armenians and Georgians had been defending against the advance of the Ottoman Empire. In June 1918, in order to forestall an Ottoman advance on Tiflis, the Georgian troops controlled the Lori Province, which had an overwhelming Armenian population. After the Armistice of Mudros and the withdrawal of the Ottomans, the Georgian forces remained. Georgian Menshevik parliamentarian Irakli Tsereteli offered that the Armenians would be safer from the Turks as Georgian citizens. The Georgians offered a quadripartite conference including Georgia, Armenia, Azerbaijan, and the Mountainous Republic of the Northern Caucasus in order to resolve the issue, which the Armenians rejected. In December 1918, the Georgians were confronting a rebellion chiefly in the village of Uzunlar in the Lori region. Within days, hostilities commenced between the two republics.

The Georgian–Armenian War was a border war fought in 1918 between the Democratic Republic of Georgia and the Democratic Republic of Armenia over the parts of then disputed provinces of Lori, Javakheti but were largely populated by Armenians.

Red Army invasion (1921)

In February 1921, the Red Army invaded Georgia and after a short war occupied the country. The Georgian government was forced to flee. Guerrilla resistance in 1921–1924 was followed by a large-scale patriotic uprising in August 1924. Colonel Kakutsa Cholokashvili was one of the most prominent guerrilla leaders in this phase.

Georgian Soviet Socialist Republic  (1921–1990)

During the Georgian Affair of 1922, Georgia was forcibly incorporated into the Transcaucasian SFSR comprising Armenia, Azerbaijan, and Georgia (including Abkhazia and South Ossetia). The Soviet Government forced Georgia to cede several areas to Turkey (the province of Tao-Klarjeti and part of Batumi province), Azerbaijan (the province of Hereti/Saingilo), Armenia (the Lore region) and Russia (northeastern corner of Khevi, eastern Georgia).

Georgia was spared the worst excesses of the collectivization which started in 1930. The rate of collectivization was also slow reaching 75% only in 1937.

Soviet rule was harsh: about 40,000 people were lost to the collectivization and purges under Stalin and his secret police chief, the Georgian Lavrenty Beria. In 1936, the TFSSR was dissolved and Georgia became the Georgian Soviet Socialist Republic.

Reaching the Caucasus oilfields was one of the main objectives of Adolf Hitler's invasion of the USSR in June 1941, but the armies of the Axis powers did not get as far as Georgia. The country contributed almost 550,000 fighters (300,000 were killed) to the Red Army, and was a vital source of textiles and munitions. However, a number of Georgians fought on the side of the German armed forces, forming the Georgian Legion.

During this period Stalin ordered the deportation of the Chechen, Ingush, Karachay and the Balkarian peoples from the Northern Caucasus; they were transported to Siberia and Central Asia for alleged collaboration with the Nazis. He abolished their respective autonomous republics. The Georgian SSR was briefly granted some of their territory until 1957.

Stalin's successful appeal for patriotic unity eclipsed Georgian nationalism during the war and diffused it in the years following. On March 9, 1956, about a hundred Georgians were killed when they demonstrated against Nikita Khrushchev's policy of de-Stalinization.

The decentralisation program introduced by Khrushchev in the mid-1950s was soon exploited by Georgian Communist Party officials to build their own regional power base. A thriving pseudo-capitalist shadow economy emerged alongside the official state-owned economy. While the official growth rate of the economy of the Georgia was among the lowest in the USSR, such indicators as savings level, rates of car and house ownership were the highest in the Union, making Georgia one of the most economically successful Soviet republics. Corruption was at a high level. Among all the union republics, Georgia had the highest number of residents with high or special secondary education.

Although corruption was hardly unknown in the Soviet Union, it became so widespread and blatant in Georgia that it came to be an embarrassment to the authorities in Moscow. Eduard Shevardnadze, the country's interior minister between 1964 and 1972, gained a reputation as a fighter of corruption and engineered the removal of Vasil Mzhavanadze, the corrupt First Secretary of the Georgian Communist Party. Shevardnadze ascended to the post of First Secretary with the blessings of Moscow. He was an effective and able ruler of Georgia from 1972 to 1985, improving the official economy and dismissing hundreds of corrupt officials.

Soviet power and Georgian nationalism clashed in 1978 when Moscow ordered revision of the constitutional status of the Georgian language as Georgia's official state language. Bowing to pressure from mass street demonstrations on April 14, 1978, Moscow approved Shevardnadze's reinstatement of the constitutional guarantee the same year. April 14 was established as a Day of the Georgian Language.

Shevardnadze's appointment as Soviet Foreign Minister in 1985 brought his replacement in Georgia by Jumber Patiashvili, a conservative and generally ineffective Communist who coped poorly with the challenges of perestroika. Towards the end of the late 1980s, increasingly violent clashes occurred between the Communist authorities, the resurgent Georgian nationalist movement and nationalist movements in Georgia's minority-populated regions (notably South Ossetia). On April 9, 1989, Soviet troops were used to break up a peaceful demonstration at the government building in Tbilisi. Twenty Georgians were killed and hundreds wounded and poisoned. The event radicalised Georgian politics, prompting many—even some Georgian communists—to conclude that independence was preferable to continued Soviet rule.

Independent Georgia

Gamsakhurdia presidency (1991–1992)

Opposition pressure on the communist government was manifested in popular demonstrations and strikes, which ultimately resulted in an open, multiparty and democratic parliamentary election being held on 28 October 1990 in which the Round Table—Free Georgia bloc captured 54 percent of the proportional vote to gain 155 seats out of the 250 up for election, while the communists gained 64 seats and 30 percent of the proportional vote. The leading dissident Zviad Gamsakhurdia became the head of the Supreme Council of the Republic of Georgia. On March 31, 1991, Gamsakhurdia wasted no time in organising a referendum on independence, which was approved by 98.9% of the votes. Formal independence from the Soviet Union was declared on April 9, 1991, although it took some time before it was widely recognised by outside powers such as the United States and European countries. Gamsakhurdia's government strongly opposed any vestiges of Russian dominance, such as the remaining Soviet military bases in the republic, and (after the dissolution of the Soviet Union) his government declined to join the Commonwealth of Independent States (CIS).

Gamsakhurdia was elected president on May 26, 1991, with 86% of the vote. He was subsequently widely criticised for what was perceived to be an erratic and authoritarian style of government, with nationalists and reformists joining forces in an uneasy anti-Gamsakhurdia coalition. A tense situation was worsened by the large amount of ex-Soviet weaponry available to the quarreling parties and by the growing power of paramilitary groups. The situation came to a head on December 22, 1991, when armed opposition groups launched a violent military coup d'état, besieging Gamsakhurdia and his supporters in government buildings in central Tbilisi. Gamsakhurdia managed to evade his enemies and fled to the breakaway Russian republic of Chechnya in January 1992.

Shevardnadze presidency (1992–2003)

The new government invited Eduard Shevardnadze to become the head of a State Council—in effect, president—in March 1992, following Gamsakhurdia's ouster. In August 1992, a separatist dispute in the Georgian autonomous republic of Abkhazia escalated when government forces and paramilitaries were sent into the area to quell separatist activities. The Abkhaz fought back with help from paramilitaries from Russia's North Caucasus regions and alleged covert support from Russian military stationed in a base in Gudauta, Abkhazia and in September 1993 the government forces suffered a catastrophic defeat, which led to them being driven out and the entire Georgian population of the region being expelled. Around 14,000 people died and another 300,000 were forced to flee.

Ethnic violence also flared in South Ossetia but was eventually quelled, although at the cost of several hundred casualties and 100,000 refugees fleeing into Russian North Ossetia. In south-western Georgia, the autonomous republic of Ajaria came under the control of Aslan Abashidze, who managed to rule his republic from 1991 to 2004 as a personal fiefdom in which the Tbilisi government had little influence.

On September 24, 1993, in the wake of the Abkhaz disaster, Zviad Gamsakhurdia returned from exile to organise an uprising against the government. His supporters were able to capitalise on the disarray of the government forces and quickly overran much of western Georgia. This alarmed Russia, Armenia and Azerbaijan, and units of the Russian Army were sent into Georgia to assist the government. Gamsakhurdia's rebellion quickly collapsed and he died on December 31, 1993, apparently after being cornered by his enemies. In a highly controversial agreement, Shevardnadze's government agreed that it would join the CIS as part of the price for military and political support.

Shevardnadze narrowly survived a bomb attack in August 1995 that he blamed on his erstwhile paramilitary allies. He took the opportunity to imprison the paramilitary leader Jaba Ioseliani and ban his Mkhedrioni militia in what was proclaimed as a strike against "mafia forces". However, his government—and his own family—became increasingly associated with pervasive corruption that hampered Georgia's economic growth. He won presidential elections in November 1995 and April 2000 with large majorities, but there were persistent allegations of vote-rigging.

The war in Chechnya caused considerable friction with Russia, which accused Georgia of harbouring Chechen guerrillas. Further friction was caused by Shevardnadze's close relationship with the United States, which saw him as a counterbalance to Russian influence in the strategic Transcaucasus region. Georgia became a major recipient of US foreign and military aid, signed a strategic partnership with NATO and declared an ambition to join both NATO and the EU. In 2002, the United States sent hundreds of Special Operations Forces to train the Military of Georgia—a programme known as the Georgia Train and Equip Program. Perhaps most significantly, the country secured a $3 billion project for a Caspian-Mediterranean pipeline (Baku–Tbilisi–Ceyhan pipeline)

A powerful coalition of reformists headed by Mikheil Saakashvili and Zurab Zhvania united to oppose Shevardnadze's government in the November 2, 2003 parliamentary elections. The elections were widely regarded as blatantly rigged, including by OSCE observers; in response, the opposition organised massive demonstrations in the streets of Tbilisi. After two tense weeks, Shevardnadze resigned on November 23, 2003, and was replaced as president on an interim basis by Burjanadze.

These results were annulled by the Georgia Supreme Court after the Rose Revolution on November 25, 2003, following allegations of widespread electoral fraud and large public protests, which led to the resignation of Shevardnadze.

Saakashvili presidency (2004–2013)

2004 elections
A new election was held on March 28, 2004. The National Movement – Democrats (NMD), the party supporting Mikheil Saakashvili, won 67% of the vote; only the Rightist Opposition (7.6%) also gained parliamentary representation passing the 7% threshold.

On January 4, Mikheil Saakashvili won the Georgian presidential election, 2004 with an overwhelming majority of 96% of the votes cast. Constitutional amendments were rushed through Parliament in February strengthening the powers of the President to dismiss Parliament and creating the post of Prime Minister. Zurab Zhvania was appointed Prime Minister. Nino Burjanadze, the interim President, became Speaker of Parliament.

First term (2004–2007)
The new president faced many problems on coming to office. More than 230,000 internally displaced persons put an enormous strain on the economy. Peace in the separatist areas of Abkhazia and South Ossetia, overseen by Russian and United Nations peacekeepers in the framework of Organization for Security and Co-operation in Europe, remained fragile.

The Rose Revolution raised many expectations, both domestically and abroad. The new government was expected to bring democracy, ending a period of widespread corruption and government inefficiency; and to complete state-building by re-asserting sovereignty over the whole Georgian territory. Both aims were very ambitious; the new ruling elite initiated a process of concentration of power in the hands of the executive, in order to use the revolutionary mandate to change the country. In fact, the Saakashvili government initially achieved impressive results in strengthening the capacity of the state and toppling corruption. Georgia's ranking in the Corruption Perceptions Index by Transparency International improved dramatically from rank 133 in 2004 to 67 in 2008 and to 51 in 2012, surpassing several EU countries. But such achievements could only result from the use of unilateral executive powers, failing to achieve consent and initiating a trade-off between democracy-building and state-building.

After the Rose Revolution, relations between the Georgian government and semi-separatist Ajarian leader Aslan Abashidze deteriorated rapidly, with Abashidze rejecting Saakashvili's demands for the writ of the Tbilisi government to run in Ajaria. Both sides mobilised forces in apparent preparations for a military confrontation. Saakashvili's ultimatums and massive street demonstrations forced Abashidze to resign and flee Georgia (2004 Adjara crisis).

Relations with Russia remained problematic due to Russia's continuing political, economic and military support to separatist governments in Abkhazia and South Ossetia. Russian troops still remained garrisoned at two military bases and as peacekeepers in these regions. Saakashvili's public pledge to resolve the matter provoked criticism from the separatist regions and Russia. In August 2004, several clashes occurred in South Ossetia.

On October 29, 2004, the North Atlantic Council (NAC) of NATO approved the Individual Partnership Action Plan of Georgia (IPAP), making Georgia the first among NATO's partner countries to manage this task successfully.

Georgia  supported the coalition forces in Iraq War. On November 8, 2004, 300 extra Georgian troops were sent to Iraq. The Georgian government committed to send a total of 850 troops to Iraq to serve in the protection forces of the UN Mission. Along with increasing Georgian troops in Iraq, the US will train additional 4 thousand Georgian soldiers within frames of the Georgia Train-and-Equip Program (GTEP).

In February 2005 Prime Minister Zurab Zhvania died, and Zurab Nogaideli was appointed as the new Prime Minister. Saakashvili remained under significant pressure to deliver on his promised reforms. Organisations such as Amnesty International have pushed serious concerns over human rights. Discontent over unemployment, pensions and corruption, and the continuing dispute over Abkhazia, have greatly diminished Saakashvili's popularity in the country.

In 2006 Georgia's relationship with Russia was at nadir due to the Georgian–Russian espionage controversy and related events. In 2007, a political crisis led to serious anti-government protests, and Russia allegedly led a series of airspace violations against Georgia.

2007 crisis
Since the weakening of the democratic credentials of the Saakashvili cabinet after the police crackdown of the 2007 protests, the government has put the stress on his successful economic reforms. Kakha Bendukidze was pivotal in the libertarian reforms launched under Saakashvili, including one of the least restrictive labour codes, the lowest flat income tax rates (12%) and some of the lowest customs rates worldwide, along with the drastic reduction of necessary licenses and permits for business. The objective of the Georgian elite switched to the aim of "a functioning democracy with the highest possible level of economic liberties", as expressed by the prime minister Lado Gurgenidze.

Saakashvili called new parliamentary and presidential elections for January 2008. In order to contest the presidential election, Saakashvili announced his resignation effective 25 November 2007, with Nino Burjanadze becoming acting president for a second time (until the election returned Saakashvili to office on 20 January 2008).

Second term (2008–2013)

In August 2008 Russia and Georgia engaged in the 2008 South Ossetia war. Its aftermath, leading to the 2008–2010 Georgia–Russia crisis, is still tense.

The 2012 parliamentary elections

In October 2011 famous Georgian tycoon Bidzina Ivanishvili admitted his entrance to politics of Georgia. In December he established opposition political movement Georgian Dream and announced his desire to take part in the 2012 parliamentary elections. In February 2012 they formed coalition with Republican Party of Georgia, Free Democrats, National Forum and Industry Will Save Georgia. Tensions rose during pre-election campaign, whereas many leaders of opposition were arrested. 54% of electorate voted in favor of the newly formed coalition, thus Georgia Dream obtained 65 seats in parliament.

In October 2012, Saakashvili admitted defeat for his party in parliamentary elections. In his speech he said that "the opposition has the lead and it should form the government – and I as president should help them with this". This represented the first democratic transition of power in Georgia's post-Soviet history.

Margvelashvili presidency (2013–2018)
On 17 November 2013, Giorgi Margvelashvili won the Georgian presidential election, 2013 with 62.12% of the votes cast. With this, a new constitution came into effect which devolved significant power from the President to the Prime Minister. Margvelashvili's inauguration was not attended by his predecessor Mikheil Saakashvili, who cited disrespect by the new government towards its predecessors and opponents.

Margvelashvili initially refused to move to the luxurious presidential palace built under Saakashvili in Tbilisi, opting for more modest quarters in the building of the State Chancellery until a 19th-century building once occupied by the U.S. embassy in Georgia is refurbished for him. However, he later started to occasionally use the palace for official ceremonies. This was one of the reasons for which Margvelashvili was publicly criticized, in a March 2014 interview with Imedi TV, by the ex-Prime Minister Ivanishvili, who said he was "disappointed" in Margvelashvili.

In October 2016, the ruling party, Georgian Dream, won the parliamentary election with  48.61 percent of the vote and the opposition United National Movement (UNM) 27.04 percent. Georgian Dream came to power in 2012, ending UNM’s nine-year rule. It was funded by tycoon Bidzina Ivanishvili, the country’s richest man and party chief, while the opposition UNM was founded by former president Mikheil Saakashvili.

Zurabishvili presidency (2018-) 

In November 2018, Salome Zurabishvili won Georgia's presidential election, becoming the first woman to hold the office. She was backed by the ruling Georgian Dream party. However, the new constitution made the role of president largely ceremonial. It was the last direct election of a Georgian president, as the country switched to a parliamentary system.

On 31 October 2020, the ruling Georgian Dream, led by Bidzina Ivanishvili, secured over 48% of votes in the parliamentary election. It gave the party the right to form the country's next government and continue governing alone. The opposition made accusations of fraud, which the Georgian Dream denied. Thousands of people gathered outside the Central Election Commission to demand a new vote.

In February 2021, Irakli Garibashvili became Prime Minister of Georgia, following the resignation of Prime Minister Giorgi Gakharia. Prime Minister  Irakli Garibashviliis, who had an earlier term as prime minister in 2013-15, is a close ally of the powerful founder of the ruling Georgian Dream party, Bidzina Ivanishvili.

On 1 October 2021, former President Mikheil Saakashvili was arrested on his return from exile. Saakashvili led the country from 2004 to 2013 but was later convicted in absentia on corruption charges, which he denied.

See also 

 History of the Caucasus
 List of the Kings of Georgia
 List of Georgian battles

References

Citations

Sources 

 Ammon, Philipp: Georgien zwischen Eigenstaatlichkeit und russischer Okkupation: Die Wurzeln des russisch-georgischen Konflikts vom 18. Jahrhundert bis zum Ende der ersten georgischen Republik (1921), Klagenfurt 2015, .
Avalov, Zurab: Prisoedinenie Gruzii k Rossii, Montvid, S.-Peterburg 1906
Anchabadze, George: History of Georgia: A Short Sketch, Tbilisi, 2005, .
Allen, W.E.D.: A History of the Georgian People, 1932
Assatiani, N. and Bendianachvili, A.: Histoire de la Géorgie, Paris, 1997
Braund, David: Georgia in Antiquity: A History of Colchis and Transcaucasian Iberia 550 BC–AD 562. Clarendon Press, Oxford 1994, .
Bremmer, Jan, & Taras, Ray, "New States, New Politics: Building the Post-Soviet Nations",Cambridge University Press, 1997.
Gvosdev, Nikolas K.: Imperial policies and perspectives towards Georgia: 1760–1819, Macmillan, Basingstoke, 2000, .
Iosseliani, P.: The Concise History of Georgian Church, 1883.
Lang, David M.: The last years of the Georgian Monarchy: 1658–1832, Columbia University Press, New York 1957.
Lang, David M.: The Georgians, 1966.
Lang, David M.: A Modern History of Georgia, 1962.
Manvelichvili, A: Histoire de la Georgie, Paris, 1955
Salia, K.: A History of the Georgian Nation, Paris, 1983.
 Steele, Jon. "War Junkie: One Man`s Addiction to the Worst Places on Earth" Corgi (2002). .
 Suny, R.G.: The Making of the Georgian Nation, 2nd Edition, Bloomington and Indianapolis, 1994, .

Further reading
 Ammon, Philipp: Georgien zwischen Eigenstaatlichkeit und russischer Okkupation: Die Wurzeln des russisch-georgischen Konflikts vom 18. Jahrhundert bis zum Ende der ersten georgischen Republik (1921). Kitab (2015). 
 Gasimov, Zaur (2011), The Caucasus, EGO - European History Online, Mainz: Institute of European History, retrieved: March 25, 2021 (pdf).
 Gvosdev, Nikolas K.: Imperial policies and perspectives towards Georgia: 1760–1819, Macmillan, Basingstoke 2000, 
 Goltz, Thomas. Georgia Diary : A Chronicle of War and Political Chaos in the Post-Soviet Caucasus. Thomas Dunne Books (2003). 
 Maisuradze, Giorgi: "Time Turned Back: On the Use of History in Georgia" in the Caucasus Analytical Digest No. 8

External links
 www.royalhouseofgeorgia.ge
 Georgia - A Country Study, Library of Congress 
 List of rulers of Georgia 
 Kartuli Idea-The Georgian Idea by Dr. Levan Z. Urushadze 
 The Bagrationi Royal Dynasty of Georgia by Dr. Levan Z. Urushadze.- Issued by the International Academy for the Promotion of Historical Studies (IAPHS), 2005 
 2002 Georgia timeline
 2003 Georgia timeline
 2004 Georgia timeline
 2005 Georgia timeline
Robert Bedrosian's page of Armenian and Georgian Historical Sources (e.g. The Georgian Chronicle)